Étretat is a commune in the Seine-Maritime department in the Normandy region of Northwestern France. It is located on the coast of the Pays de Caux area. In 2017, it had a population of 1,291.

The cliffs

The Etretat Chalk Complex, as it is known, consists of a complex stratigraphy of Turonian and Coniacian chalks.

These cliffs and the associated resort beach attracted artists including Eugène Boudin, Charles Daubigny, Gustave Courbet and Claude Monet. They were featured prominently in the 1909 Arsène Lupin novel The Hollow Needle by Maurice Leblanc. They also feature in the 2014 film Lucy, directed by Luc Besson.

Two of the three famous arches are visible from the town, the Porte d'Aval, and the Porte d'Amont. The Manneporte is the third and the biggest one, and cannot be seen from the town.

The GR 21 long-distance hiking path (Le Havre to Le Tréport) passes through the town.

The White Bird

Étretat is known for being the last place in France from which the 1927 biplane The White Bird (L'Oiseau Blanc) was seen.  French World War I war heroes Charles Nungesser and François Coli were attempting to make the first non-stop flight from Paris to New York City, but after the plane's 8 May 1927 departure, it disappeared somewhere over the Atlantic.  It is considered one of the great unexplained mysteries of aviation.  A monument to the flight was established in Étretat, but destroyed during World War II, when the Germans occupied the area.  A new and taller monument was constructed in 1963, along with a nearby museum.

Demographics

Economy

The economy of Étretat rests mainly on tourism, which gives the locals a growing commercial outlet.  The city places itself as the number one tourist attraction in Normandy, as the site most visited along with Bénédictine distillery and museum at Fécamp, the Rouen Cathedral and the Claude Monet Foundation in Giverny.

During the eighteenth and nineteenth centuries the economy was supplemented by kelp-burning on the beaches.  The white plumes of smoke by the shore can be clearly seen in George Inness' painting 'Étretat' (1875, Wadsworth Athenaeum).  "The discovery and development of iodine-rich mineral deposits in Chile about the same time the iodine-from-kelp industry reached full vigor, dealt the kelp industry another severe blow in the late 1870s.  However, small quantities of kelp continued to be harvested for soda, potash and iodine in northern France".

Notable people

Étretat was the birthplace of Élie Halévy (1870–1937), philosopher and historian.
Guy de Maupassant (1850–1893) spent most of his childhood in Étretat, at "Les Verguies". In 1882 he wrote a short story for Le Gaulois entitled "The Englishman of  Étretat" (L'Anglais d'Étretat), based on encounters in 1868, as a house guest of G. E. J. Powell, with the English poet Algernon Charles Swinburne, whom he had helped save from drowning. The dried human hand displayed on one of the tables was later acquired by Maupassant to adorn his Paris apartment; it inspired another short story, "The Flayed Hand" (La Main Écorchée). In 1883 he built his own house in  Étretat, "La Guillette", in the Mediterranean style in "Le Grand Val", since renamed rue Guy-de-Maupassant. Jean-Baptiste Faure (1830–1914), the great French operatic baritone whose career centred on Paris and London, also owned a villa there. A friend of the artist Édouard Manet and a keen collector of art, Faure did amateur paintings of the local area, including the scenic cliff. Claude Monet did several paintings in the area particularly of the natural cliff arches and stacks.

Jacques Offenbach had a villa there called “Villa d'Orphée”, named after his operetta, Orpheus in the Underworld.

In popular media
Much of the filming for the fifth episode of the first season of Lupin (TV series) was completed in and near the commune. This location is significant because Maurice Leblanc, the creator of the character Arsène Lupin (a fictional master thief) featured in 17 novels and 39 novellas, lived in the commune. He wrote much of the series at his home. (In total, Leblanc wrote over 60 novels and short stories.) That home is now the Clos Lupin Museum.

Gallery: Étretat in paintings

See also
Communes of the Seine-Maritime department
Etretat Churchyard
Etretat Gardens

References

External links

 
Alternative site of Étretat 
3D view from Google Earth of part of Étretat's cliffs 
The full story of English eccentric Algernon Swinburne's near drowning at Etretat and his meeting with Maupassant (English)

Cliffs of Metropolitan France
Communes of Seine-Maritime
Natural arches of France
Seaside resorts in France
Stacks (geology)
Landforms of Normandy
Rock formations of France
Caletes